Sinogastromyzon is a genus of hillstream loaches native to eastern Asia.

IUCN has assessed conservation status of 14 Sinogastromyzon species. Of these, ten are considered "Data Deficient", three of "Least Concern", and one (S. puliensis) "Vulnerable".

Species 
There is some dispute over the species in this genus.  This list derives primarily from the work of Kottelat, 2012, with the addition of subsequently described species.  There are currently 21 recognized species in this genus:
 Sinogastromyzon chapaensis Đ. Y. Mai, 1978
 Sinogastromyzon daduheensis Y. S. Guo & Jun Yang, 2013
 Sinogastromyzon daon V. H. Nguyễn, 2005 (species inquirenda in this genus)
 Sinogastromyzon dezeensis W. X. Li, W. N. Mao & Zong-Min Lu, 1999
 Sinogastromyzon hagiangensis V. H. Nguyễn, 2005 (species inquirenda in this genus)
 Sinogastromyzon hsiashiensis P. W. Fang, 1931
 Sinogastromyzon hypercorpus V. H. Nguyễn, 2005 (species inquirenda in this genus)
 Sinogastromyzon lixianjiangensis S. W. Liu, X. Y. Chen & J. X. Yang, 2010
 Sinogastromyzon macrostoma S. W. Liu, X. Y. Chen & J. X. Yang, 2010
 Sinogastromyzon maon V. H. Nguyễn & H. D. Nguyễn, 2005 (species inquirenda in this genus)
 Sinogastromyzon minutus Đ. Y. Mai, 1978 (species inquirenda in this genus)
 Sinogastromyzon multiocellum V. H. Nguyễn, 2005
 Sinogastromyzon namnaensis V. H. Nguyễn, 2005
 Sinogastromyzon nanpanjiangensis W. X. Li, 1987
 Sinogastromyzon nantaiensis I. S. Chen, C. C. Han & L. S. Fang, 2002
 Sinogastromyzon puliensis Y. S. Liang, 1974
 Sinogastromyzon rugocauda Đ. Y. Mai, 1978
 Sinogastromyzon sichangensis H. W. Chang, 1944
 Sinogastromyzon szechuanensis P. W. Fang, 1930
 Sinogastromyzon tonkinensis Pellegrin & Chevey, 1935
 Sinogastromyzon wui P. W. Fang, 1930

References 

 
Balitoridae
Fish of Asia
Taxonomy articles created by Polbot